Vladyslava Antonivna Aleksiyiva (born 29 May 2001) is a Ukrainian synchronised swimmer. She is World Championships medalist. Maryna Aleksiyiva, who is also a synchro swimmer, is her twin sister.

Career
At the 2017 World Aquatics Championships Aleksiiva won a bronze medal in team free routine which became her first major international achievement. The next day she won silver in the combination event.

References

2001 births
Living people
Ukrainian synchronized swimmers
World Aquatics Championships medalists in synchronised swimming
Synchronized swimmers at the 2017 World Aquatics Championships
Sportspeople from Kharkiv Oblast
Artistic swimmers at the 2019 World Aquatics Championships
European Aquatics Championships medalists in synchronised swimming
Synchronized swimmers at the 2020 Summer Olympics
Olympic synchronized swimmers of Ukraine
Olympic bronze medalists for Ukraine
Olympic medalists in synchronized swimming
Medalists at the 2020 Summer Olympics
Artistic swimmers at the 2022 World Aquatics Championships
21st-century Ukrainian women
Twin sportspeople
Ukrainian twins